Celebrate – The Night of the Warlock is an EP by German female hard rock singer Doro Pesch, released in 2008 through AFM Records. The EP preceded of a few months the album Fear No Evil and includes three versions of the song "Celebrate". In the single version of the song the chorus is provided by a group of Doro fans, while the other two contain in the chorus the vocal performances of Saxon's frontman Biff Byford and of many female heavy metal singers. The song itself is a new collaboration of Doro with the old Warlock producer Joey Balin and is meant to celebrate the 25th anniversary of Doro's career.

The EP reached position No. 75 in the German single chart.

Track listing
"Celebrate" (single version) (Doro Pesch, Joey Balin) – 4:56
"Celebrate" (feat. Biff Byford) – 4:56
"Celebrate" (Full Metal Female version) – 4:56
"The Night of the Warlock" (single version) (Pesch, Chris Lietz) – 5:14
"Rescue Me" (Pesch, Jean Beauvoir) – 3:50

Personnel

Band members
Doro Pesch – vocals, producer
Nick Douglas – bass
Joe Taylor – guitars
Johnny Dee – drums
Oliver Palotai – keyboards, guitars
Luca Princiotta – keyboards, guitars

Additional musicians
Biff Byford – backing vocals on track 2
Sabina Classen, Floor Jansen, Angela Gossow, Veronica Freeman, Liv Kristine, Ji-In Cho, Liv Jagrell, Girlschool – backing vocals on track 3
Andreas Bruhn – guitars, bass, producer, engineer, mixing
Chris Lietz – guitar, keyboards, engineer, mixing, mastering
Torsten Sickert – keyboards, guitars, bass, programming, producer, engineer, mixing
Klaus Vanscheidt – guitar, backing vocals
Christoph Siemons – guitar, backing vocals
Bernd Aufermann – guitar
Lukas Dylong, Dirk Schoppen – backing vocals

References

Doro (musician) EPs
2008 EPs
AFM Records EPs